Valentino Furlanetto (born 11 May 1965) is a former international speedway rider from Italy.

Speedway career 
Furlanetto reached the final of the Speedway World Pairs Championship six times from 1986 until 1992.

He rode in the top tier of British Speedway in 1988, riding for Sheffield Tigers. He was the 1987 and 1989 Italian champion.

World Final appearances

World Pairs Championship
 1986 -  Pocking, Rottalstadion (with Armando Castagna) - 8th - 15pts
 1987 -  Pardubice, Svítkov Stadion (with Armando Castagna) - 8th - 18pts
 1988 -  Bradford, Odsal Stadium (with Armando Castagna) - 7th - 21pts
 1989 -  Leszno, Alfred Smoczyk Stadium (with Armando Dal Chiele) - 8th - 15pts
 1991 -  Poznań, Olimpia Poznań Stadium (with Armando Castagna / Fabrizio Vesprini) - 6th - 10pts
 1992 -  Lonigo, Pista Speedway (with Armando Castagna / Armando Dal Chiele) - 4th - 18pts

Ice World Championship
1984  Moscow, 16th

References 

1965 births
Italian speedway riders
Sheffield Tigers riders
Living people
Sportspeople from the Province of Vicenza